, there is an ongoing constitutional crisis in Ukraine since 27 October 2020, when the Constitutional Court of Ukraine invalidated much of Ukraine's 2014 anti-corruption reform as unconstitutional.

Background
In July 2020, 49 People's Deputies of Ukraine (47 of these were members of the Opposition Platform — For Life political party) appealed to the Constitutional Court with a motion to recognize as  unconstitutional the law on the High Anti-Corruption Court of Ukraine of 7 June 2018. On 16 September, the Constitutional Court ruled unconstitutional certain provisions of the law on the National Anti-Corruption Bureau of Ukraine (NABU). On 28 July it declared unconstitutional the Presidential decree of 16 April 2015 on the appointment of Artem Sytnyk as NABU Director. On 27 October the court, on the motion of 47 legislators, recognized the provisions of the laws on e-declarations' vetting as unconstitutional and stripped the relevant watchdog, the National Agency for Prevention of Corruption (NACP) of powers to vet declarations and identify conflicts of interest. This decision deprived the NACP of access to state registers required for vetting declarations of candidates for government offices, thus blocking the appointment of officials, including those elected in the October 2020 Ukrainian local elections. The NABU responded by claiming that as a result of the court ruling all criminal cases probing inaccurate asset declaration would be closed, while officials exposed on abuse would avoid responsibility.

Constitutional crisis

2020
The 27 October ruling of the Constitutional Court of Ukraine ruled invalidated much of Ukraine's 2014 anti-corruption reform as unconstitutional. Following the decision, President Volodymyr Zelenskyy warned that if parliament did not restore these anti-corruption laws, foreign aid, loans and a visa-free travel to the European Union were at risk. Governor Kyrylo Shevchenko of the National Bank of Ukraine reported that Ukraine will not receive the scheduled $700 million IMF load before the end of 2020 because of the issue. IMF assessment teams had not visited Ukraine for eight months, which is necessary for further IMF loan tranches to be released. The European Union (EU) issued a statement that the court's decision called "into question a number of international commitments which Ukraine assumed in relation to its international partners, including the EU."

On 29 October, President Zelenskyy submitted to the Ukrainian parliament a draft law, offering an early termination of powers of the Constitutional Court's entire composition. Lawmakers rejected this bill, including several members of Zelenskyy's ruling Servant of the People political party. Some accused him of a power grab. On 27 January 2021 Zelenskyy withdrew the bill.

On 4 December 2020, the Ukrainian parliament restored anti-corruption legislation shut down by the court decision, when it reauthorized criminal penalties for officials who provide false information about their incomes.

In December 2020, the Constitutional Court of Ukraine was unable to carry out its usual functions because of some justices boycotting the court. On 29 December 2020 President Zelenskyy suspended the courts chairperson Oleksandr Tupytskyi for two months in an effort to end the crisis. The following day the Constitutional Court stated it considered the President's decree "legally insignificant" and they did not plan to implement it. The Prosecutor General's office had also asked President Zelenskyy to suspend Tupytskyi for two months after he failed to show up for police questioning. Tupytskyi is under investigation of alleged attempts to influence a witness through bribery and providing false testimony three times in a case against a company that produces transport equipment in 2018 and 2019, when he served as deputy chairman of the Constitutional Court.

2021
On 8 February 2021, the  dismissed a lawsuit requested by Tupytskyi against the State Security Administration for not allowing him to work in the Constitutional Court. The court noted that Tupytskyi had not provided evidence confirming the danger to "his rights and interests."

On 26 February 2021, President Zelenskyy signed a decree that suspended chairperson Tupytskyi for another month.

On 27 March 2021, Zelenskyy annulled the decree of former President Viktor Yanukovych of May 2013, appointing Oleksandr Tupytskyi and  judges of the Constitutional Court of Ukraine. According to Zelenskyy, their tenure did "pose a threat to state independence and national security of Ukraine, which violates the Constitution of Ukraine, human and civil rights and freedoms." According to Zelenskyy, their appointments were canceled following an audit of the decrees of President Yanukovych carried out by the National Security and Defense Council of Ukraine. 

On 14 July 2021, the administrative court within the Constitutional Court declared Zelenskyy's 27 March 2021 decree illegal and revoked it. The court concluded that "the President of Ukraine does not have the authority to decide on the dismissal or termination of powers of judges of the Constitutional Court or to decide to revoke the decree on the previous appointment of a judge of the Constitutional Court."

On 19 October 2021 the Constitutional Court (itself) began considering the constitutionality of President Zelenskyy's three decrees that suspended the courts own chairperson Tupytskyi. Proceedings were opened due to a constitutional request of 49 Ukrainian MP's, mostly members of the Batkivshchyna faction.

On 26 November 2021 President Zelenskyy appointed Oksana Hryshchuk and Oleksandr Petryshyn judges of the Constitutional Court, although on 14 July 2021 the Constitutional Court had declared Zelenskyy's 27 March 2021 decree to dismiss Oleksandr Tupytskyi and Oleksandr Kasminin illegal and thus technically there were no vacancies in the Constitutional Court. Four days later the judges of the Constitutional Court decided not to swear in Hryshchuk and Petryshyn "until vacancies appear."

See also

References

External links
 Official web-site of the Constitutional Court of Ukraine
 Official web-site of the Constitutional Court of Ukraine

Political scandals in Ukraine
Ukraine
Ukraine
constitutional crisis
constitutional crisis
constitutional crisis
Constitutional Court of Ukraine
Ukraine
Ukraine
Ukraine
Law of Ukraine
Volodymyr Zelenskyy